Federal Highway 2D (Fed. 2D) is a part of the federal highways corridors, and is the designation for toll highways paralleling Mexican Federal Highway 2. Seven road segments are designated Highway 2D, all but one in the state of Baja California, providing a toll highway stretching from Tijuana in the west to around Mexicali in the east; one in Sonora, between Santa Ana and Altar; and another between the cities of Matamoros and Reynosa in Tamaulipas.

Tijuana–Tecate and Libramiento de Tecate
The Highway 2D designation takes over from Baja California State Route 201 at the interchange with Bulevar Alberto Limón Padilla on the northeast edge of Tijuana, roughly following the course of the Tijuana River for a portion of its route. Three interchanges serve Tecate, two with Federal Highway 2 on either side of Tecate and a third with Blvd. Universidad which serves as the northern terminus of Mexican Federal Highway 3 to Ensenada.

Tecate–La Rumorosa
Cars pay a toll of 67 pesos to travel the highway, paid at the El Hongo toll booth located at kilometer 30.

La Rumorosa–El Centinela

From La Rumorosa, another  segment begins; this segment's concession is held by FIARUM (an acronym for Fideicomiso Público de Administración de Fondos de Inversión del Tramo Carretero Centinela-Rumorosa or "Public Trust to Administer Investment Funds for the Centinela-Rumorosa Highway)), an agency of the Government of the State of Baja California. After another interchange to La Rumorosa where the eastbound road absorbs free Highway 2, cars pay a 23-peso toll and traverse a winding road over the Sierra de Juárez, with separate mainlines for westbound and eastbound traffic. The eastbound mainline sits higher than the westbound and features two lookouts, Ojo de Aguila and El Caminero. The former opened in 2013 with an 867,000 peso investment from the highway and state cultural authorities, as well as a sculpture designed by artist Óscar Ortega. This road was first built in 1917 under the governorship of Esteban Cantu. Before this road was constructed, land travel between Tijuana and the rest of Mexico required travel through the United States.

 
Westbound and eastbound join together east of the mountain at La Cuesta, which features a lookout and military inspection station; in 2015, the regional chapter of the National Confederation of Truck Drivers complained that military inspection stations in Sonora and Baja California added significant time to their itineraries. The highway straightens out and passes through long stretches of desert, with the segment ending at an interchange allowing motorists to choose free Highway 2 to downtown Mexicali or the Libramiento de Mexicali.

FIARUM, the state agency which holds the concession, was created in 1996.

On some days, due to winding roads and poor road conditions of Highway 2D, it is faster to travel between Tijuana and Mexicali through San Diego, California and Interstate 8 (Kumeyaay Highway) in California, if traffic volume of both San Ysidro Port of Entry and Calexico West Port of Entry are low.

Libramiento de Mexicali
The Libramiento de Mexicali bypasses the city to the south, featuring the final  of highway in the 2D designation. OCACSA operates the highway, which opened on June 20, 2006, and charges cars a 75-peso toll to use it. The highway has just one interchange between its termini, allowing access to Mexican Federal Highway 5 to San Felipe. Traffic merges onto free Highway 2 between Ejido Cuernavaca and Ejido Sinaloa, to the east of Mexicali.

Santa Ana–Altar
The  highway between Santa Ana and Altar, operated by the state government, is tolled, with cars being charged 105 pesos to use the road.

Matamoros–Reynosa
Highway 2D in Tamaulipas is operated by CAPUFE and runs  from Matamoros to Reynosa. One toll booth, Nuevo Progreso, charges 67 pesos for cars.

External links
Autopista Tijuana-Tecate
FIARUM (La Rumorosa-El Centinela)
OCACSA: Libramiento de Mexicali

References 

Mexican Federal Highways